The 1990 Sharjah Cup was a cricket tournament held in Sharjah, UAE, between December 20–21, 1990.

Two national teams took part: Pakistan and Sri Lanka. Two other sides – India and West Indies – had been scheduled to take part, but withdrew due to the Gulf crisis.

Pakistan won the tournament on superior run-rate after each side won one match each. Pakistan won US$20,000 while Sri Lanka won US$10,000.

The tournament was sponsored by Instaphone.

Matches

See also
 Sharjah Cup

References

Notes

Sources
 
 Cricket Archive: Instafone Sharjah Cup 1990/91
 ESPNCricinfo: Sharjah Cup, 1990/91
 

International cricket competitions from 1988–89 to 1991
Sharjah Cup, 1990
1990 in Emirati sport
International cricket competitions in the United Arab Emirates